{{Infobox television
| image                = Cruncher Sierra 1974.JPG
| image_size           = 220
| caption              = Behind-the-scenes photo of how Cruncher the bear, a show regular, was filmed.
| genre                = police drama
| creator              = Jack Webb
| director             =
| developer            = 
| presenter            = 
| starring             = 
| voices               = 
| narrated             = 
| theme_music_composer = {{plainlist|
 Lee Holdridge
 John Denver<ref name=Theme>[http://www.classicthemes.com/50sTVThemes/themePages/sierra.html Sierra at classicthemes.com]</ref>performed byDenny Brooks
}}
| opentheme            = 
| endtheme             = 
| composer             = 
| country              = 
| language             = English
| num_seasons          = 1
| num_episodes         = 12 (11 + 1 movie)
| list_episodes        = 
| executive_producer   = 
| producer             = Bruce Johnson
| editor               = 
| location             = 
| camera               = multi-camera
| runtime              = 60 mins.
| network              = NBC
| company              = 
| distributor          = NBCUniversal Television Distribution
| picture_format       = 1.33 : 1 color
| audio_format         = monoaural
| first_aired          = 
| last_aired           = 
| preceded_by          = 
| followed_by          = 
| related              = Emergency! 
}}Sierra is a 1974 television crime drama series focusing on the efforts of National Park Service rangers to enforce federal law and to effect wilderness rescues. The program aired on NBC and was packaged by Jack Webb's Mark VII Limited for Universal Television. The show's theme song was written by Lee Holdridge (music) and John Denver (lyrics). Robert A. Cinader, executive producer of Mark VII's Emergency! (which partially inspired this show), handled this program also.

Setting
The show derived its name from its setting, the fictional Sierra National Park, a part of the U.S. National Park Service. In reality, exteriors were filmed at Yosemite National Park.  The tenth episode, "The Urban Ranger", established that the park also existed within the same fictional world populated by the characters of Emergency!, its sister Mark VII show. The two paramedic characters from Emergency!, played by Kevin Tighe and Randolph Mantooth, also appeared in Sierra "The Urban Rangers".

Cast
Like many Mark VII Limited television dramas, the show centered on a pair of leads in a public service job, backed up by a supporting cast of characters from within the same organization.  In this case, the leads were James G. Richardson as Ranger Tim Cassidy and Ernest Thompson as Ranger Matt Harper. The cast was rounded out by their boss, Chief Ranger Jack Moore (Jack Hogan), and fellow rangers Julie Beck (Susan Foster) and P. J. Lewis (Michael Warren).

Episode list
Season 1 (1972)

TV movie (1974)

Cancellation
The show was cancelled after three months, mainly due to the  popularity of The Waltons, which was its direct competition on CBS. The series finale aired on Christmas Eve as a modified version of its previously-unaired pilot episode, The Rangers.''

References

External links
 

1970s American crime drama television series
NBC original programming
Television series by Universal Television
Television series by Mark VII Limited
1974 American television series debuts
1974 American television series endings
Television shows set in California
Television shows set in Wyoming